The 5th congressional district of South Carolina is a congressional district in northern South Carolina bordering North Carolina.  The district includes all of Cherokee, Chester, Fairfield, Kershaw, Lancaster, Lee, Union and York counties and parts of Newberry, Spartanburg and Sumter counties.  Outside the rapidly growing cities of Rock Hill, Fort Mill, and Lake Wylie the district is mostly rural and agricultural.  The district borders were contracted from some of the easternmost counties in the 2012 redistricting.

The district's character is very similar to other mostly rural districts in the South. Democrats still hold most offices outside Republican-dominated York County. However, few of the area's Democrats can be described as liberal by national standards; most are fairly conservative on social issues, but less so on economics.  The largest blocs of Republican voters are in the fast-growing suburbs of Charlotte, North Carolina and Cherokee County, which shares the Republican tilt of most of the rest of the Upstate. York County is by far the largest county in the district, with almost one-third of its population, and its Republican bent has pushed the district as a whole into the Republican column in recent years.

In November 2010, the Republican Mick Mulvaney defeated longtime Congressman John Spratt and became the first Republican since Robert Smalls and the end of Reconstruction to represent the district. Following Mulvaney's confirmation as the Director of the Office of Management and Budget, a special election was held in 2017 to determine his successor. Republican Ralph Norman narrowly won the special election against Archie Parnell.

History
From 2003 to 2013 the district included all of Cherokee, Chester, Chesterfield, Darlington, Dillon, Fairfield, Kershaw, Lancaster, Marlboro, Newberry and York counties and parts of Florence, Lee and Sumter counties.

Counties 
Counties in the 2023-2033 district map.
 Cherokee County
 Chester County
 Fairfield County
 Kershaw County
 Lancaster County
 Lee County
 Spartanburg County (part)
 Sumter County (part)
 Union County
 York County

Election results from presidential races

List of members representing the district

Election results

2012

2014

2016

2017 special

2018

2020

2022

In popular culture
In the first season of House of Cards, protagonist Frank Underwood represents the district in the United States House of Representatives as a Democrat.

See also

South Carolina's congressional districts
List of United States congressional districts

References

 Congressional Biographical Directory of the United States 1774–present

05
Cherokee County
Chester County
Chesterfield County
Darlington County
Dillon County
Fairfield County
Florence County
Kershaw County
Lancaster County
Lee County
Marlboro County
Newberry County
Sumter County
York County